The 2017 Homeland Union – Lithuanian Christian Democrats leadership election took place on 11–12 February 2017 to elect the leader of the Homeland Union - Lithuanian Christian Democrats.

Gabrielius Landsbergis, leader of Homeland Union - Lithuanian Christian Democrats, asked to bring forward the election of the party leader, because he wanted to check the mandate of trust in the party after the 2016 Lithuanian parliamentary election.

The chairman of this party was elected for the first time for four years. Until this election, term has lasted two years.

Candidates 
The candidates were announced on 9 January 2017. Incumbent leader Gabrielius Landsbergis was able to run.

Declared

Withdrawn 
 Agnė Bilotaitė, Member of the Seimas (2008–present)

Results
Voting took place in 81 party's departments, 2 of them – abroad. Gabrielius Landsbergis was re-elected as party's leader.

References

2017 elections in Europe
Elections in Lithuania
2017 in Lithuania
Homeland Union politicians
Lithuanian Christian Democrats politicians
Political party leadership elections in Lithuania
Homeland Union - Lithuanian Christian Democrats leadership election